Lerum Municipality (Lerums kommun) is a municipality in Västra Götaland County in western Sweden, situated just east of Gothenburg. Its seat is located in the town of Lerum.

In 1969 the municipality got its present size when "old" Lerum was amalgamated with Skallsjö and Stora Lundby.

In 2007, Lerum Municipality launched a new logotype to be used instead of its official municipal coat of arms which features the head of an ox and three oak leaves. Municipal officials and PR staff felt the coat "outdated". Although no longer used, the coat of arms still has official status. The new logotype features a multi-coloured weaving pattern.

Localities
Floda
Gråbo
Lerum (seat)
Norsesund (partly)
Stenkullen
Tollered

References

External links

Lerum Municipality - Official site
Visitlerum.nu - Official tourist site

Municipalities of Västra Götaland County
North Älvsborg
Metropolitan Gothenburg